Francis Henry Horne (born 24 February 1983) is a South African rugby union player who played for the South African Sevens team from 2007 until 2016.
He mainly played as a flanker, but also played as a hooker or a centre on occasion.

Career

Youth and amateur rugby

Horne was born  in Port Elizabeth, South Africa. Having grown up in Wellington in the Western Cape, Horne first played rugby at a provincial level when he appeared for the  side in the 2002 Under-19 Provincial Championship. In 2003, he also represented the side at Under-20 level.

He also represented Boland-based club side Wellington between 2002 and 2006.

Boland Cavaliers

He also represented Boland's amateur side in the Provincial Amateur Competition in 2005.

He once again had limited involvement in the 2007 Vodacom Cup, playing off the bench on two occasions as the replacement hooker. However, he was included in the  Currie Cup side for the 2007 Currie Cup Premier Division.

Despite mainly being involved with the South African Sevens side (see below), he did return to provincial action for the  during the 2008 Currie Cup Premier Division, starting on five occasions and playing off the bench in one match.

South African Sevens

When the South African Rugby Union introduced central contracts for sevens players in 2007, Horne was one of the players that they contracted for the 2007–08 IRB Sevens World Series. He made his sevens debut at the 2007 Dubai Sevens tournament and immediately established himself as a key player for the team, appearing in all eight tournaments in the series.

He once again played every leg of the 2008–09 IRB Sevens World Series, as South Africa won the series for the first time at their tenth attempt. He also played in the 2009 Rugby World Cup Sevens competition, helping South Africa to the quarter-finals, where they lost to Argentina. He also won a bronze medal with the side at the 2009 World Games in Kaohsiung, Republic of China (Taiwan).

He remained an ever-present for the side over the next few seasons. During the 2013 London Sevens, Horne played in his 50th consecutive IRB Sevens World Series tournament, becoming the first player to achieve this feat.

He was also selected in the squad that played at the 2014 Commonwealth Games and helped his side to a 17–12 victory over a New Zealand that won the previous four tournaments.

Horne was not selected in the South Africa squad for the 2016 Olympics, and he retired from the South Africa sevens team at the end of 2016.

References

South African rugby union players
Living people
1983 births
Sportspeople from Port Elizabeth
Rugby union flankers
Boland Cavaliers players
South Africa international rugby sevens players
Rugby sevens players at the 2014 Commonwealth Games
Commonwealth Games gold medallists for South Africa
Commonwealth Games rugby sevens players of South Africa
Commonwealth Games medallists in rugby sevens
World Games bronze medalists
Competitors at the 2009 World Games
Medallists at the 2014 Commonwealth Games